The Moscow Summit of 1998 was a summit meeting happened on September 1–2, 1998, between President Bill Clinton and president of Russia Boris Yeltsin. The Moscow summit meeting addressed a number of important nonproliferation and arms control issues where the presidents of both countries discussed common security concerns and agreed to give each other's countries continuous information on launches of ballistic missiles in order to increase the safety of the population and reduce the possibility of nuclear war by mistake.

References 

20th-century diplomatic conferences
September 1998 events in Russia
Russia–United States relations
Presidency of Bill Clinton
Boris Yeltsin